This is a list of programs formerly and currently, and soon to be broadcast by TV Azteca owned broadcast television networks. TV Azteca owns four broadcast television networks: Azteca Uno, Azteca 7, A Más and adn40 in Mexico.

Current programming

Original programming

Children's programs
Plaza Sésamo (April 27, 2020–present)

Comedy
La resolana (2015–present)

Contests
Escape perfecto (2015–present)

Entertainment
Extranormal (2007–present)
Al extremo (2008–2014; 2016–present)
Pop central (2021–present)

Magazine and performances
Venga la alegría (January 2, 2006–present)
Ventaneando (1996–present)

News
Hechos (1994–present)
Hechos Aquí Entre Nos (2020–present)
Hechos Domingo (2020–present)
Hechos Meridiano (1994–present)
Hechos Noche con Javier Alatorre (1994–present)
Hechos sábado (1998–present)
A quien corresponda, con Jorge Garralda (1993–present)

Opinion
13 en libertad con Sergio Sarmiento (2013–present)
Aquí entre amigos con Carlos Alazraki (2013–present)
La billetera (2013–present)
La de ocho con Lourdes Mendoza, Eduardo Ruiz Healy y Horacio Villalobos (2013–present)
Los despachos del poder con Alberto Tavira (2013–present)
EC Pablo Boullosa (2013–present)
En contexto con Jaime Sánchez Susarrey (2002–present)
En el ring con Andrés Roemer (2013–present)
La Entrevista con Sarmiento (1997–present)
Frente a Frente con Lolita de la Vega (2001–present)
Katia 360 con Katia D'Artigues (2012–present)
México confidencial con Jorge Fernández Menéndez, Pablo Hiriart y Ezra Shabot (2013–present)
La pura verdad con Gabriel Bauducco (2013–present)
Reporte 13 con Ricardo Rocha (2001–present)
Vidas apasionantes con Antonio Rosique (2013–present)

Reality shows
La Academia (2002–present)
MasterChef Junior México (2016–present)
MasterChef México (2015–present)
La Voz (2019–present; Mexican version of The Voice)
La Voz Kids (2021–present; Mexican version of The Voice Kids)
La Voz Senior (2019–present; Mexican version of The Voice Senior)

Special/variety
Boton Ganador (game show)
Campañeando
Corazón grupero
En contexto
MasterChef México la Revancha
Los protagonistas
Tercer Milenio (2019–present)

Sports
Box Azteca (boxing on Saturday nights) but championship fights shared with Televisa's Sabados de Box
DeporTV
Fut Azteca: Liga MX matches on Friday nights normally of Mazatlán FC, and Puebla F.C. Non-Izzi Telecom exclusive saturday/sunday nights matches featuring Santos Laguna shared with Televisa. Selected matches of Juárez, Monterrey or Xolos Expansión MX weekly matches on Azteca Deportes Digital app only. Selected matches of the FIFA World Cup and CONCACAF Gold Cup shared with Sky and Televisa.
Home Run Azteca Mexican League Baseball. Azteca Deportes Digital app only.
Lucha Azteca Lucha Libre AAA Worldwide.
Ritual NFL Super Bowl only.
Selección Azteca Mexico national football team's all matches.

Talk shows
Mimí contigo (2021–present)

Television series
Compañeros y carnales (September 21, 2020–present)
Un día para vivir (September 6, 2021–present)
Lo que la gente cuenta (November 20, 2005–present)

Unitary
Lo que callamos las mujeres (2000–present)

Acquired programming

Anime
Dragon Ball (October 31, 2022–present on Azteca 7)
Dragon Ball Z (August 1, 2022–present on Azteca 7)
Dragon Quest: The Adventure of Dai (Dragon Quest: La aventura de Dai) (September 30, 2022–present on Azteca 7)
One Piece (August 5, 2022–present on Azteca 7)
Saint Seiya (Los Caballeros del Zodiaco) (1993; 2005–2009; August 5, 2022–present on Azteca 7)

Children's programs on Kidsiete
44 Cats (44 gatos) (September 1, 2020–present)
Abby's Amazing Adventures (Abby y sus Aventuras) (July 6, 2020–present)
Abby's Flying Fairy School (Abby y la Escuela Mágica) (August 15, 2022–present)
Adventure Time (Hora de aventura) (January 10, 2022–present)
Alvinnn!!! and the Chipmunks (ALVINNN!!! y las ardillas) (July 16, 2018–present on Azteca 7)
The Amazing World of Gumball (El increíble mundo de Gumball) (July 21, 2018 – April 9, 2021; June 27, 2022–present)
Baby Looney Tunes (June 6, 2022–present)
Bluey (May 17, 2021–present)
The Children's Kingdom (El Reino Infantil) (April 4, 2020–present on Azteca 7)
Chuggington (November 25, 2012 – 2013; January 1, 2021–present)
The Fairly OddParents (Los padrinos mágicos) (April 11, 2022–present)
The Flintstones (Los Picapiedra) (December 21, 2020 – August 11, 2022; November 21, 2022–present)
The Furchester Hotel (El Hotel Furchester) (May 31, 2021–present)
Gigantosaurus (July 7, 2020–present)
Kung Fu Panda: The Paws of Destiny (Kung Fu Panda: Las patitadas del destino) (November 19, 2022–present)
Larva Island (Isla Larva) (November 6, 2021–present on Azteca 7)
Let's Go Pocoyo (¡Vamos Pocoyó!) (March 30, 2020–present)
Molang (August 10, 2020–present on Azteca 7)
My Little Pony: Friendship Is Magic (My Little Pony: La magia de la amistad) (July 27, 2020–present)
My Little Pony: Pony Life (November 9, 2020–present)
LEGO Ninjago (December 6, 2022–present)
The Looney Tunes Show (El show de los Looney Tunes) (April 11–June 16, 2022; November 21, 2022–present)
Octonauts (Octonautas) (September 30, 2019–present)
Pocoyo (Pocoyó) (April 1, 2019–present)
Power Rangers (July 27, 2020–present)
Power Rangers: Dino Super Charge (July 27, 2020 – present)
Power Rangers: Ninja Steel & Super Ninja Steel
Power Rangers: Beast Morphers
Power Rangers: Dino Fury
Ruby Gloom (July 17, 2022–present)
ThunderCats (Coming soon)
Transformers: Rescue Bots (July 27, 2020–present)
Trollhunters: Tales of Arcadia (Trollhunters: Relatos de Arcadia) (November 19, 2022–present)
True and the Rainbow Kingdom (Vera y el reino arcoiris) (March 30, 2020–present)
Unikitty! (January 10, 2022–present)
We Bare Bears (Escandalosos) (July 16, 2018 – November 20, 2020; November 21, 2022–present)

Television series
9-1-1 (September 28, 2020–present on Azteca 7)
9-1-1: Lone Star (9-1-1: Lone Star: Emergencias Texas) (November 23, 2020–present on Azteca 7)
The Addams Family (Los locos Addams) (October 30, 2021–present on A Más)
Bewitched (Hechizada) (April 12, 2021–present on A Más)
Diff'rent Strokes (Blanco y negro) (April 12, 2021–present on A Más)
FBI (September 21, 2020–present on Azteca 7)
FBI: Most Wanted (FBI: Los más buscados) (October 4, 2021–present on Azteca 7)
Ghost Whisperer (Almas perdidas) (January 7, 2019–present on Azteca 7)
The Good Doctor (July 20, 2020–present on Azteca 7)
Malcolm in the Middle (Malcolm el de enmedio) (Coming soon on Azteca 7)
The Nanny (La niñera) (April 12, 2021–present on A Más)
Nurses (Enfermeras) (April 18, 2022–present on Azteca 7)
Sabrina the Teenage Witch (Sabrina la bruja adolescente) (April 12, 2021–present on Azteca 7)
The Simpsons (Los Simpson) (1993–present on Azteca 7)
Smallville (August 22, 2022–present on Azteca 7)
S.W.A.T. (July 16, 2018–present on Azteca 7)
The Twilight Zone (La dimensión desconocida) (March 7, 2021–present on A Más)

Upcoming programing
Madres e hijos (TBA)

Former programming

Original programming

Animated series
Descontrol (2005–2006)
Los reyes de la colonia (2014; produced by Huevocartoon)

Children's programs
Bucaneros (1997–1999)
Caritele (1993–1997)
Disney Club (1999–2016)
Está de Kellogg's (2000–2001)
La hora de los chavos (1997–1998)
Nintendomanía (1995–2000)
El show de Tatiana (2012)
Telechobis (1998–1999)

Comedy
3 familias (2017–2018)
¡Ay caramba! (1999–2006, 2012–2016; funny video program, hosted by Burroberto Burrieta Burron, a CGI-animated donkey from Yucatán)
Buenos para nada (1998)
De risa en risa (2010)
Un día en peregrino (2009)
Fábrica de huevos (2013–2014; produced by Huevocartoon)
Una familia con Ángel (1998–1999)
Hechos de peluche (1996–2006, 2016–2017)
Infarto (2004–2006)
El informal (2006–2007)
A la mexicana (1997–1998)
La niñera (2007)
¡Oops! (2007–2008)
Picante y caliente (2000–2002)
Pinche pancho (2012)
Puro loco (1995–2007)
Qué cotorreo (2000–2001)
Que papelón (2010)
¡Qué risa! (2007–2008)
Supertitlán (May 30–August 18, 2022)
Te caché (1996–2002)
Verdád o fixión (1994–1995)
Viva la tarde (2000)
¡Ya cayó! (2003–2010)
¡Ya cayó! renovado (2010–2011)

Contests
1000 becas generación bicentenario (2010)
A todo dar (1993–1994)
Aguas con el Muro (2008)
Asgaard (2008–2009)
Bailando por un millón (2005)
¡Boomǃ (2016)
Buena suerte (2011)
Cazatesoros (2021)
Chitón (1997–1998)
Cuenta y gana (1999)
Doble cara (2007–2013)
A ganar con Omar (2001–2002)
Gente con chispa (2000–2002, 2004)
¡Grítalo! (2004–2007)
Homenaje a... (2003)
Identidad: Las apariencias engañan (2007–2008)
Jeopardy! (1998–2000)
Justo a tiempo (2010)
El legado (2015)
Lotería mexicana (2010–2011)
Mejores amigos (2000–2001)
Mi pareja puede (2018–2020)
No pierdas el billete (2015)
Para todos (2009–2010)
La Pareja Ideal, el amor a Prueba (2021)
Password: La palabra secreta (2010–2012)
El poder del 10 (2008)
Qué nochecita (1995–1996)
¿Quién quiere ser millonario? (2010–2012; Mexican version of Who Wants to Be a Millionaire?)
¿Quién tiene estrella? (2007)
Reina por un día (2011)
Ritmo Azteca (1996–1997)
El rival más débil (2003–2008, 2013–2014; Mexican version of Weakest Link)
Rola la rola (1996–1998)
¿Sabes quién sabe? ¡Ve tú a saber! (2014–2015)
Sensacional (2002)
Sexos en guerra (2002–2006)
La silla (2005)
¿Te la juegas?
¿Te la sabes? ¡Cántala! (2007–2008)
Te regalo mi canción (2005)
Te toca (1996)
Telemillones (1995)
Todo o nada (2015)
Todos quieren fama (2020–2021)
¡Viva el show! (2015)

Entertainment
Casos sin respuesta (1997–2020)
Confesiones del más allá (2013)
Difícil de creer (2007–2014)
En busca de lo desconocido (1997)
En medio del espectáculo (1994–2002)
Este enterado (1994–1996)
Estudio 7 (1999–2001)
Evidencias (1996–1998)
El Hormiguero MX (2014–2015)
Insomnia (2000–2015)
Riesgo total (2001–2002)
Si hay y bien (1999)
Una tras otra (1998–1999)
Ya llegó Mayito (2001–2002)

Magazine and performances
Los 25+ (2003–2015)
Aquí está la papa (2002)
Cada mañana (2000–2005)
Caiga quien caiga (1997–2000, 2007–2010, 2018–2019)
Chiflando y aplaudiendo (2007)
Con sello de mujer (1998–2007)
Con un nudo en la garganta (2000–2004)
Deberían estar trabajando (2013)
Los del 7 (2012–2013)
Ellas arriba (2014–2015)
En medio del espectáculo (1994–2002)
Famosos en jaque (2005–2011)
Un gran día (2007)
Hasta mañana es lunes (2014–2015)
La historia detrás del Mito (2005–2014, 2017)
Historias engarzadas (2004–2014, 2016)
Póker de Reinas (2008)
¿Qué hay de comer? (2016–2018)
Raquel y Daniel (2015)
El ojo del huracán (1997–2005)
Sobrexpuesto (1994–1995)
¡Suéltalo! (2006)
Las tardes con la Bigorra (2016–2017)
Tempranito (1998–2007)
Tómbola (2001–2002)
Tras las rejas (2013–2014)
Al tu x tu (2006–2009)
Va que va (2005–2013)
Venga el domingo (2012–2017)
Vengache Pa'Ca (2008–2009)
Vidas al límite (2005–2010)

Music
Alfa Dance Club (1996–1998)
Coca-Cola rock Líquido (1995–1996)
Conexión (2014–2015)
Deezer Live (2020–2021)
Domingo Azteca (1999–2000)
Hasta mañana es lunes (2014–2015)
Hit M3 (2005–2014)
Mugo TV (2019–2020)
La música tiene sentido (1996)
Neon Nights con Enrique Aguilera (1998-2001)
Top Ten (1999–2014)
Pico de gallo (1998)
Video D (1994–1996)

News
AM Revista informativa (2004–2005)
Ciudad desnuda (1995–1997)
De 7 a 9 (posteriormente de 6 a 9) (2006–2007)
Desde México buenos días (1993–1994)
Desde México buenas noches (1993–1994)
Desde México buenas tardes (1993–1994)
Hechos AM (1998–2004, 2005–2006, 2007–2020)
Hechos del 7 (1998–2007)
Hola México (1996–1998, 2012–2014)
Info 7 (2007–2009)
Perspectiva 13 (2007–2009)
A primera hora (1994–1996)
Visión urbana (1998–1999)

Opinion
Animal nocturno con Ricardo Rocha y Patricia Llaca (2005–2015)
Entre tres con Federico Reyes Heroles, Jesús Silva-Herzog Márquez y Carlos Elizondo Mayer-Serra (2004–2012)
Expediente 13:22:30 con Verónica Velasco (1995–1996)
Hablemos claro con Lolita de la Vega (1993–2000)
Línea de fuego con Eduardo Ruiz Healy (1999–2000)
La otra cara de la moneda con David Páramo (2013–2016)
Shalalá con Sabina Berman (2007–2013)
Tocando vidas con Esteban Moctezuma (2013–2018)

Reality shows
Exatlón México (2017–2022)

Special programs
Oscar 2011
Oscar 2012
Oscar 2013
Oscar 2014
Oscar 2015
Oscar 2016
Oscar 2017
Oscar 2018
Oscar 2019
Oscar 2020
Oscar 2021
Oscar 2022
TV Azteca 10 años, un sueño que hace historia (2003)

Talk shows
Cara a Cara con María Laria (1993-1997)
Cosas de la vida (1999–2003; 2010–2015)
Cuenta conmigo (2003)
Ella es Niurka (2011)
Enamorándonos (2017–2020)
Laura de todos (2009–2010)
Necesito una amiga (2009)
Al otro lado del espejo (2003–2004)
Se vale soñar (1997–1998)
Sevcec (1995-1997)
El show de Raquel (2011)
TKE (2000)

Telenovelas

Television series
El César (September 18–December 11, 2017)
Drenaje profundo (October 2010 – 2011)
Hernán (21 November 2019)
Lotería del crimen (October 10–November 17, 2022)
Lucho en familia (March 28–May 27, 2011)
María Magdalena (October 15, 2018 – February 1, 2019)

Unitary
A cada quién su santo (2009–2013)
La vida es una canción (2004–2007; 2010–2011)
Rutas de la vida (March 14–July 7, 2022)

Acquired programming

Anime on Azteca Trece/Azteca Uno
Candy Candy
Case Closed (Detective Conan)
Choppy and the Princess (La princesa caballero)
Dragon Quest: The Adventure of Dai (Las aventuras de Fly)
Mahō no Mako-chan (Mako la sirena enamorada)
Mazinger Z
Mischievous Twins: The Tales of St. Clare's (Las gemelas de St. Clare)
Queen Millennia (La princesa de los mil años)
Sailor Moon
Saint Seiya (Los Caballeros del Zodiaco)
Thumbelina: A Magical Story (Almendrita)

Anime on Azteca 7
B't X
Bakugan: Battle Planet (November 30, 2020 – September 25, 2021)
Beyblade Burst Turbo (July 28, 2020 – June 12, 2021)
The Brave Frog (La ranita Demetán)
Candy Candy
Captain Tsubasa (Supercampeones)
Captain Tsubasa J (Supercampeones J)
Case Closed (Detective Conan)
Choppy and the Princess (La princesa caballero)
Doraemon (July 16, 2018 – June 1, 2019)
The Haunted House (La casa embrujada)
Inuyasha
Kitaro
Lalola
Magic Bullet Chronicles Ryukendo (Ryukendo)
Magic Knight Rayearth (Las Guerreras Mágicas)
Mahō no Mako-chan (Mako la sirena enamorada)
Maya the Bee (La abeja Maya)
Mazinger Z
Mischievous Twins: The Tales of St. Clare's (Las gemelas de St. Clare)
Monkey Magic
Nobody's Boy: Remi (Remi)
Pokémon (June 12, 2017 – June 29, 2019)
Queen Millennia (La princesa de los mil años)
Ranma ½
Red Baron (El Barón Rojo)
Robin Hood (La leyenda de Robin Hood) (1998–1999)
Sailor Moon
Sailor Moon Crystal
Saint Seiya: The Lost Canvas (Los Guerreros del Zodiaco: El lienzo perdido) (2011)
Saint Tail (Las aventuras de Saint Tail)
Sally the Witch (Sally)
Slam Dunk
Slayers (Los Justicieros)
Sonic X
The Story of Heidi (Heidi)
Super Grand Prix (Grand Prix)
Superbook (Super libro)
Thumbelina: A Magical Story (Almendrita)
The Vision of Escaflowne (La visión de Escaflowne)
Yaiba
YAT Untroubled Space Tours (YAT)
Zenki

Anime on a+/A Más
Christopher Columbus (Cristóbal Colón, el descubrimiento)
Ranma ½
Sailor Moon Crystal
Superbook (Super libro)

Children's programs on Azteca Trece/Azteca Uno
ALF: The Animated Series (ALF: La serie animada)
Biker Mice from Mars (Los motorratones de Marte)
Birdman and the Galaxy Trio (Birdman y el Trío Galaxia)
Care Bears (Los ositos Cariñositos)
Earthworm Jim
Freakazoid! (¡Fenomenoide!)
Highlander: The Animated Series (Highlander: El inmortal)
Little Rosey (La pequeña Rosey)
Mundo Simi: La serie animada
The Ruff and Reddy Show (Ruff y Reddy)
Superman
X-Men: The Animated Series (X-Men)

Children's programs on Azteca 7
Nubeluz3 Amigonauts (Los 3 amigonautas)ALF: The Animated Series (ALF: La serie animada)Animaniacs (June 15, 2020 – July 15, 2022)The Archie Show (Archie y sus amigos)Ben 10 (April 21, 2018 – June 13, 2020)Care Bears (Los ositos Cariñositos)Clarence (2020)Curious George (Jorge el curioso)The Day Henry Met (El día que Henry conoció) (April 1, 2019 – April 26, 2020)The Dreamstone (El mago de los sueños)Earthworm JimFreakazoid! (¡Fenomenoide!)Galinha Pintadinha (Gallina Pintadita)Galinha Pintadinha Mini (Gallina Pintadita Mini)Garfield and Friends (Garfield y sus amigos)Hallo Spencer (Hola Spencer from the original German program, not the Saban Productions version)Highlander: The Animated Series (Highlander: El inmortal)The Jetsons (Los Supersónicos) (December 21, 2020 – May 7, 2021; August 31, 2021 – January 3, 2022)The Jungle Bunch: To the Rescue! (La pandilla de la selva: Al rescate) (March 4, 2019 – October 2, 2020; December 20, 2021 – January 3, 2022; August 29–October 28, 2022)The Jungle Bunch: News Beat (La pandilla de la selva: Último momento)LazyTown (2009–November 11, 2012)Little Rosey (La pequeña Rosey)Max Adventures (Max Inicia) (2011–2015)Monchhichi (April 11–November 18, 2022)Mr. Bean: The Animated Series (Mr. Bean)The Not-Too-Late Show with Elmo (Buenas noches con Elmo) (September 12, 2021 – January 16, 2022)OK K.O.! Let's Be Heroes (¡OK, KO! Seamos héroes) (June 8–November 16, 2019)OlocoonsOm Nom Stories (October 10, 2020 – May 30, 2021)Pirata & Capitano (Pirata y Capitano) (April 1, 2019 – April 25, 2020)PoochiniPound PuppiesPinky and the Brain (Pinky y Cerebro) (June 15, 2020 – May 27, 2022)The Powerpuff Girls (Las chicas superpoderosas; 1998) (April 2018 – 2021)The Powerpuff Girls (Las chicas superpoderosas; 2016) (July 16, 2018 – March 29, 2019)The Scooby-Doo Show (El show de Scooby-Doo) (April 11, 2022 – March 5, 2023)El Show de XuxaSonic UndergroundSuper 4 (2019)SupermanThe Sylvester & Tweety Mysteries (Las aventuras de Silvestre y Piolín) (August 23, 2021 – July 10, 2022)Tiny Toon Adventures (Las aventuras de los Tiny Toons) (July 20, 2020 – September 16, 2022)Top Cat (Don Gato y su pandilla) (August 24, 2021 – July 9, 2022)Winx Club (season 5 only: July 1–August 23, 2019)Wolverine and the X-Men (Wolverine y los X-Men)Zak Storm (September 14, 2020 – January 7, 2021)Zorro: Generation Z (Zorro: Generación Z)

Programs from Disney Channel, Playhouse Disney/Disney Junior and other Disney kids series101 Dalmatian Street (Calle Dálmatas 101) (June 2, 2019)101 Dalmatians: The Series (101 dálmatas: La serie) (1999–2003)The Adventures of the Gummi Bears (Los osos Gummi)Aladdin (Aladdín)American Dragon: Jake Long (Jake Long: El dragón occidental) (2006–2007; July 5, 2008–February 2011)Avengers Assemble (Los Vengadores Unidos) (2014–2016)The Avengers: Earth's Mightiest Heroes (Los Vengadores: Los héroes más poderosos del planeta) (2013–2015)BonkersThe Book of Pooh (El libro de Pooh)Buzz Lightyear of Star Command (Buzz Lightyear Comando Estelar)Chip 'n Dale: Rescue Rangers (Chip y Dale al rescate)Dave the Barbarian (Dave el bárbaro) (2004–2005)Doc McStuffins (Doctora Juguetes) (August 14, 2017 – December 27, 2020)Doug (1999–2001)DuckTales (Patoaventuras, 1987)DuckTales (Patoaventuras, 2017) (2017–2019)Elena of Avalor (Elena de Avalor)The Emperor's New School (Las nuevas locuras del emperador)Fancy Nancy (Fancy Nancy Clancy) (2018–2020)Fish Hooks (Pecezuelos) (2013–2016)Goldie & Bear (Goldie y Osito)Goof Troop (La tropa Goofy)Gravity FallsHandy Manny (Manny a la obra) (2009–2010)Hercules (Hércules)House of Mouse (El show del ratón) (2002–2007)Junior ExpressKick Buttowski: Suburban Daredevil (Kick Buttowski: Medio doble de riesgo) (2012–2014)Kim Possible (2004–2005)Lilo & Stitch: The Series (Lilo y Stitch: La serie) (2004–2012)The Lion Guard (La guardia del león) (August 14, 2017 – December 31, 2020)Lloyd in Space (Lloyd del Espacio) (2002–2003)The Little Mermaid (La sirenita)Mickey and the Roadster Racers/Mickey Mouse Mixed-Up Adventures (Mickey: Aventuras sobre ruedas/Mickey Mouse: Mix de aventuras) (August 14, 2017 – December 31, 2020)Mickey Mouse Clubhouse (La casa de Mickey Mouse) (seasons 1–2 only: 2010–2013; season 3 only: August 14, 2017 – January 1, 2021)Mickey Mouse Works (Mickeymanía)Mighty Ducks: The Animated Series (Los campeones)Miles from Tomorrowland (Miles del Mañana)Morko y MaliMuppet Babies (June 10, 2018 – December 25, 2020)My Friends Tigger & Pooh (Mis amigos Tigger y Pooh) (2009–2011)The New Adventures of Winnie the Pooh (Las aventuras de Winnie Pooh) (2006–2009)Nivis: Amigos de otro mundo (July 21, 2019 – December 25, 2020)Pepper AnnPhineas and Ferb (Phineas y Ferb) (April 5, 2010 – 2016; 2018–March 21, 2020)PlaygroundPucca (April 5, 2010 – October 21, 2012)Puppy Dog Pals (2018)Quack PackRecess (Recreo) (1999–2011)The Replacements (Los sustitutos) (2009–2014)Sabrina: The Animated Series  (Sabrina, la brujita) (2001–2004)Sheriff Callie's Wild West (La Sheriff Callie en el Oeste) (August 14–October 16, 2017)Sofia the First (Princesita Sofía) (August 14, 2017 – November 20, 2020)Star Wars Rebels (Marathon: December 12, 2015; January 3, 2016–January 20, 2019)Star Wars: The Clone Wars (Star Wars: La guerra de los clones)T.O.T.S. (T.O.T.S.: Servicio de entrega de animalitos) (December 15, 2019 – December 20, 2020)Timon & Pumbaa (Timón y Pumba) (1999–2012)Tangled: The Series/Rapunzel's Tangled Adventure (Enredados otra vez: la serie/Las aventuras enredadas de Rapunzel) (January 1, 2018 – December 24, 2020)Vampirina (December 7, 2017 – December 4, 2020)Ultimate Spider-Man (2013–2016)W.I.T.C.H.Yin Yang Yo! (2010)

Programs from Fox KidsSpider-ManX-Men: The Animated Series (X-Men)

Programs from Hasbro Studios/Allspark/Entertainment OneTransformers: Cyberverse (November 16, 2020 – January 21, 2022)

Programs from HIT EntertainmentAngelina Ballerina: The Next Steps (Angelina Ballerina)Barney & Friends (Barney y sus amigos)Bob the Builder (Bob el constructor) (2007–2013)PinguThomas & Friends (Thomas y sus amigos) (2007–2012)

Programs from Mondo TVAngel's Friends (April 21–May 26, 2018)Drakers (April 16, 2018 – March 31, 2019)Sissi: The Young Empress (Sissi: La joven emperatriz)  (April 22, 2018 – March 31, 2019)Puppy in My Pocket: Adventures in Pocketville (Aventuras en Pocketville) (April 16, 2018 – April 26, 2020)The Treasure Island (La isla del tesoro) (April 21–October 21, 2018)

Programs from NetflixKazoops! (August 26, 2019 – April 13, 2020)

Programs from RCN TelevisiónBetty Toons (August 24–September 24, 2020; January 9–May 29, 2021)

Programs from Universal Animation Studios and DreamWorks Animation TelevisionDragons: Race to the Edge (Dragones: Carrera al borde) (July 25–September 29, 2022)Trolls: The Beat Goes On! (Trolls: ¡No pierdas el ritmo!) (April 11–June 23, 2022)

Programs from UPN KidsFantastic Four (Los 4 Fantásticos)The Incredible Hulk (Hulk: El hombre increíble)

Programs from YTVKid vs. Kat (July 12, 2010 – April 8, 2012)

Syndicated from Sony Pictures TelevisionHotel Transylvania: The Series (Hotel Transylvania: La serie) (April 12, 2021 – October 30, 2022)The Real Ghostbusters (Los verdaderos Cazafantasmas)

Syndicated from WildBrainRev & Roll (January 6, 2020 – January 23, 2022)

Other acquired programmingAtchoo! (January 7, 2019 – September 21, 2019)Boonie Bears (Los osos Boonie) (April 1, 2019 – September 19, 2021)Bubu and the Little Owls (Bubu y las lechucitas) (April 1, 2019 – August 11, 2022)Fantasy Patrol (July 2, 2019 – February 1, 2020)Larva (July 1, 2019 – May 22, 2020)My Big Big Friend (Amigazazo) (April 28, 2020 – January 23, 2022)Rainbow Ruby (July 1, 2019 – June 26, 2020)

Children's programs on a+/A MásAngel's FriendsAvengers Assemble (Los Vengadores Unidos)DinofrozDrakersGravity FallsSissi: The Young Empress (Sissi: La joven emperatriz)Ultimate Spider-ManThe Treasure Island (La isla del tesoro)

Television series on Azteca Trece/Azteca UnoAmores Roubados (Amores robados)BatmanLa familia del BarrioGhost Whisperer (Almas perdidas)The Green Hornet (El Avispón Verde)Guys Next Door (Los chicos de al lado)The Holy Family (La sagrada familia)Kadın (Fuerza de mujer)Land of the Giants (Tierra de gigantes)Married... with Children (Matrimonio... con hijos)Radio Free RoscoeŞeref Meselesi (Honor y respeto)The Simpsons (Los Simpson)

Programs from Disney television seriesHasta que te conocí (2016; September 6–15, 2017)

Television series on Azteca 71600 PennAladdin – Naam Toh Suna Hoga (Aladdin ¿Recuerdas ese nombre?)ALF (1998 – 2000; 2006 – 2009)American Ninja WarriorBatmanBen-HurBia (February 22 – December 26, 2020)Bizim Hikaye (Amor de familia)Blue Bloods (Códigos de familia)Brothers & Sisters (5 hermanos)Café con aroma de mujer (1994 – 1995)CastleThe Chicago Code (Chicago Code: Codigo del crimen)The Client ListCode Black (Código negro) (2021 – January 6, 2022)Confissões de Adolescente (Confesiones de adolescentes)Cougar TownCriminal Minds (Mentes Criminales) (2007 – October 6, 2022)Criss Angel MindfreakDaddies on Request (Papás por encargo) (episodes 1–2) (July 15, 2022)Dawson's CreekDesperate Housewives (Esposas desesperadas)DexterElementaryFlashpointA Gift for Whom You Hate (Entrega de odio) (July 1 – September 9, 2022)The Glades (The Glades: Sol mortal)GleeGrachiThe Green Hornet (El Avispón Verde)Guys Next Door (Los chicos de al lado)Hawaii Five-0 (Hawaii 5-0; 1968)Hawaii Five-0 (Hawaii 5-0; 2010)The Holy Family (La sagrada familia)Horario estelar (episodes 1–2) (February 17, 2023)El InternadoJesus of Nazareth (Jesús de Nazareth)Keeping Up with the Kardashians (Las Kardashian)Lie to Me (Miénteme)The Listener (Vidente)LostMagic's Biggest Secrets Finally Revealed (Los secretos mas grandes de la magia por fin revelados)Married... with Children (Matrimonio... con hijos)Merlin (Merlín)Merlin's Apprentice (El aprendiz de Merlín)Mi Gorda BellaMonster JamMr. BeanMy Haunted House (Mi casa embrujada)New GirlNinja WarriorNoah's Ark (El arca de Noé)Olvidarte jamásPantanalPrivate Practice (Addison)A Próxima Vítima (La próxima víctima)Repatriated (El repatriado) (episodes 1–2) (September 23, 2022)Samantha Who?Santa Evita (episodes 1–2) (July 29, 2022)ScorpionScrubsSelena's Secret (El secreto de Selena) (January 11 – 22, 2021)The Shield (El escudo)SnoopsSon of the Beach (La playa)Spin CityThe Strain  (La plaga)Titanic (1996) (December 25, 2000)Titanic (2012)

Programs from CBC TelevisionDegrassi Junior High/Degrassi High (Los estudiantes de Degrassi)

Programs from Disney television seriesAgents of S.H.I.E.L.D.Bia (February 22–December 26, 2020)Daddies on Request (Papás por encargo) (episodes 1–2) (July 15, 2022)Grey's AnatomyHannah Montana (2007–2011)I'm in the Band (Estoy en la banda)JonasLizzie McGuireRepatriated (El repatriado) (episodes 1–2) (September 23, 2022)Santa Evita (episodes 1–2) (July 29, 2022)Selena's Secret (El secreto de Selena) (January 11 – 22, 2021)Sonny with a Chance (Sunny entre estrellas)Soy LunaThe Suite Life of Zack & Cody (Zack y Cody)That's So Raven (Es tan Raven)Violetta (2014–2015)Wizards of Waverly Place (Los hechiceros de Waverly Place)

Programs from Lionsgate TelevisionMacGyverPrograms from MGM TelevisionThirtysomething (Después de los 30)

Programs from Paramount television seriesThe 4400 (Los 4400)CSI: MiamiCSI: New YorkClub 57 (September 13, 2019 – September 26, 2020)DuckmanJerichoKally's Mashup (June 3–September 6, 2019)NCIS (NCIS: Criminología Naval)NCIS: Los Angeles (NCIS: Los Ángeles)S Club 7 (2000–2001)The Secret World of Alex Mack (El mundo secreto de Alex Mack)

Programs from RCN TelevisiónHasta que la plata nos separe (November 9–16, 2020; January 10–27, 2022)Yo soy Betty, la fea (June 1–November 16, 2020; January 10–September 29, 2022)

Programs from Universal television seriesThe Munsters (La familia Munster)Saved by the Bell (Salvado por la campana)

Syndicated from 20th Century Fox TelevisionAlly McBealAmerican Dad! (Un agente de familia)American Horror StoryAngel (Ángel)Bones (2006–January 6, 2022)Buffy the Vampire Slayer (Buffy, la cazavampiros)Dharma & Greg (Dharma y Greg)Doogie Howser, M.D. (Doogie Howser)EmpireFuturama (May 10–November 24, 2000; March 25–September 19, 2003; December 27, 2004–January 3, 2005)Land of the Giants (Tierra de gigantes)Sex & Drugs & Rock & RollTraffic Light (Sonámbulos)White Collar (Cuello blanco)The Wonder Years (Los años maravillosos)

Syndicated from Sony Pictures TelevisionFranklin & BashThe Nanny (La niñera)SeinfeldSyndicated from Warner Bros. TelevisionThe Fresh Prince of Bel-Air (El príncipe del rap en Bel Air) (1995–December 13, 2002; April 12, 2021 – April 2, 2022)Full House (Full House: Tres por tres) (1993–April 23, 1998)Gilligan's Island (La isla de Gilligan)Sex and the CityTelevision series on a+/A MásAcorraladaAdını Feriha Koydum (El secreto de Feriha)Agents of S.H.I.E.L.D.American Pickers (Cazadores de tesoros)Ancient Aliens (Alienígenas ancestrales)BackstromEcomoda (December 21–30, 2022)Eva LunaFantasy Island (La Isla de la Fantasía)Fatmagül'ün Suçu Ne? (¿Qué culpa tiene Fatmagül?)Gata SalvajeHasta que la plata nos separeHeidi, bienvenida a casaKadın (Fuerza de mujer)My Haunted House (Mi casa embrujada)Ninja WarriorSacrificio de mujerWhite Collar (Cuello blanco)

adn402111Cake BossThe Fresh Prince of Bel-Air (El príncipe del rap en Bel Air)The MusketeersPawn Stars (El precio de la historia)Pompeii (Pompeya)SherlockTwo Guys and a Girl (Tres para todo)The Wonder Years (Los años maravillosos)

Original programming

a+/A Más
Original programming
NewsAsignación especialSpecial/varietyMe das ansias¡Pásele, yo invito!Ponle de nocheAzteca 7
Original programming
Special/varietyGrand Prix del verano (Game show)Más allá del chismeEl RetadorTunéame la Nave (Mexican adaptation of MTV'S reality series Pimp My Ride)Tunéame la Nave: La competenciaSports2020 Olympic GamesS-PulseWWE SmackDown (2008–2014)

Azteca Trece/Azteca Uno
Original programming
Special/varietyLa Academia KidsBuenas Noches con Edith SerranoEl gran juego de la oca (Game show)Grand Prix del verano (Game show)Planeta DisneyEl poder del amor (Reality show) (February 4–8, 2019)

Acquired programming
TelenovelasLas aguas mansas (1996)Avenida BrasilConfissões de Adolescente (Confesiones de adolescentes)El Oasis de Shakira (1996)A Escrava Isaura (La esclava Isaura)A Favorita (La favorita)Guadalupe (1995; 1997)Kassandra (1993-1994)La porta Zaina (1994-1995)Marielena (1993–1994)Manuela (1994)PantanalA Próxima Vítima (La próxima víctima)Salve Jorge (La guerrera)Señora tentación (1995)Tres destinos (1994–1995)Verdades SecretasA Vida da Gente (La vida sigue)La viuda de Blanco (1997)

Programming blocks
CurrentCinema Uno (Azteca Uno)Kidsiete (Azteca 7)Planeta Anime (Azteca 7)Platinum (Azteca 7)

FormerAntesala Estelar (Azteca 7)Cine Trece (Azteca Trece)Cinema Estelar (Azteca 7)Reconexión (Azteca 7)Sábado Apantallante (Azteca 7)Sábados de Blockbuster (Azteca 7)Skape'' (Azteca 7)

Production company

Major
NBCUniversal Television and Streaming
DreamWorks Animation Television
Paramount Global
Nickelodeon Animation Studio
Sony
Sony Pictures Television
Walt Disney Television
Disney Television Animation
WarnerMedia
Cartoon Network Studios

References

TV Azteca
TV Azteca